Alanyurt is a village in Güzelyurt District of Aksaray Province, Turkey. Its population is 229 (2021). The agricultural land around the village is not sufficient to support the village, therefore a part of the village populace works in construction business in big cities.

References

Villages in Güzelyurt District, Aksaray